Luis Gabriel Rentería (September 13, 1988 – March 6, 2014) was a Panamanian football forward, who played at the end of his professional career for Tauro in the Liga Panameña de Fútbol.

Club career
Nicknamed Matagatos (Catkiller), Rentería started his career at Orión and played the majority of his career for Tauro but joined Bolivar after one year on loan at Colombian side Real Cartagena where he scored 2 goals in 19 appearances. Renteria was the leading goalscorer in Panama's Primera Division and played his final game in September 2013 against Plaza Amador.

International career
Rentería made his debut for Panama in a September 2010 friendly match against Costa Rica and had earned a total of 26 caps, scoring 6 goals. He has represented his country in 4 FIFA World Cup qualification matches and played at the 2011 Copa Centroamericana as well as at the 2011 CONCACAF Gold Cup.

His final international was a February 2013 FIFA World Cup qualification match against Costa Rica.

Personal life
In October 2013, Rentería was diagnosed with lupus. He died from this disease on March 6, 2014 after being hospitalized for eight months in the Hospital Santo Tomas.

Honours
 Primera Division Champions (2010) 
 Primera Division Top goalscorer  (2010, 2012)
 CONCACAF Champions League 2010/2011 (participant)
 Copa Centroamericana 2011 (3rd place)
 Gold Cup 2011 (semi-finalist)

References

External links

1988 births
2014 deaths
Sportspeople from Panama City
Association football forwards
Panamanian footballers
Panama international footballers
2011 Copa Centroamericana players
2011 CONCACAF Gold Cup players
Tauro F.C. players
Real Cartagena footballers
Club Bolívar players
Categoría Primera A players
Bolivian Primera División players
Panamanian expatriate footballers
Panamanian expatriate sportspeople in Colombia
Expatriate footballers in Colombia
Expatriate footballers in Bolivia
Deaths from lupus
Liga Panameña de Fútbol players